Thomassetia is a genus of beetles in the family Buprestidae, containing the following species:

 Thomassetia anniae (Obenberger, 1928)
 Thomassetia crassa (Waterhouse, 1887)
 Thomassetia natalensis (Thery, 1928)
 Thomassetia parva Bellamy, 1996
 Thomassetia strandi Obenberger, 1936

References

Buprestidae genera